Mark Steele may refer to:

 Mark Steele (politician), South African member of Parliament
 Mark Steele (cricketer) (born 1976), former English cricketer
 Mark Steele (conspiracy theorist), British conspiracy theorist

See also
 Mark Steel (born 1960), British comedian and left-wing commentator